Adrian Wilson may refer to:

Adrian Wilson (book designer) (1923–1988), American book designer and printer
Adrian Wilson (artist) (born 1964), British artist and photographer
Adrian Wilson (actor) (born 1969), South African model and actor
Adrian Wilson (American football) (born 1979), American football executive and former safety